The arrondissement of Dinan is an arrondissement of France in the Côtes-d'Armor department in the Brittany region. It has 67 communes.

Composition

The communes of the arrondissement of Dinan, and their INSEE codes, are:
 
 Aucaleuc (22003)
 Beaussais-sur-Mer (22209)
 Bobital (22008)
 Bourseul (22014)
 Broons (22020)
 Brusvily (22021)
 Calorguen (22026)
 Caulnes (22032)
 Les Champs-Géraux (22035)
 La Chapelle-Blanche (22036)
 Corseul (22048)
 Créhen (22049)
 Dinan (22050)
 Évran (22056)
 Fréhel (22179)
 Guenroc (22069)
 Guitté (22071)
 Le Hinglé (22082)
 Lancieux (22094)
 Landébia (22096)
 La Landec (22097)
 Langrolay-sur-Rance (22103)
 Languédias (22104)
 Languenan (22105)
 Lanvallay (22118)
 Matignon (22143)
 Mégrit (22145)
 Plancoët (22172)
 Pléboulle (22174)
 Plélan-le-Petit (22180)
 Pleslin-Trigavou (22190)
 Pleudihen-sur-Rance (22197)
 Pléven (22200)
 Plévenon (22201)
 Plorec-sur-Arguenon (22205)
 Plouasne (22208)
 Plouër-sur-Rance (22213)
 Pluduno (22237)
 Plumaudan (22239)
 Plumaugat (22240)
 Quévert (22259)
 Le Quiou (22263)
 Ruca (22268)
 Saint-André-des-Eaux (22274)
 Saint-Carné (22280)
 Saint-Cast-le-Guildo (22282)
 Saint-Hélen (22299)
 Saint-Jacut-de-la-Mer (22302)
 Saint-Jouan-de-l'Isle (22305)
 Saint-Judoce (22306)
 Saint-Juvat (22308)
 Saint-Lormel (22311)
 Saint-Maden (22312)
 Saint-Maudez (22315)
 Saint-Méloir-des-Bois (22317)
 Saint-Michel-de-Plélan (22318)
 Saint-Pôtan (22323)
 Saint-Samson-sur-Rance (22327)
 Taden (22339)
 Trébédan (22342)
 Tréfumel (22352)
 Trélivan (22364)
 Tréméreuc (22368)
 Trévron (22380)
 La Vicomté-sur-Rance (22385)
 Vildé-Guingalan (22388)
 Yvignac-la-Tour (22391)

History

The arrondissement of Dinan was created in 1800. At the January 2017 reorganisation of the arrondissements of Côtes-d'Armor, it lost 25 communes to the arrondissement of Saint-Brieuc.

As a result of the reorganisation of the cantons of France which came into effect in 2015, the borders of the cantons are no longer related to the borders of the arrondissements. The cantons of the arrondissement of Dinan were, as of January 2015:

 Broons
 Caulnes
 Collinée
 Dinan-Est
 Dinan-Ouest
 Évran
 Jugon-les-Lacs
 Matignon
 Merdrignac
 Plancoët
 Plélan-le-Petit
 Ploubalay

References

Dinan